Shishir Rana, also known as Shishir SJB Rana is a Nepali actor, producer, director and writer who has appeared in several Nepali movies and Television serials such as Madan Bahadur Hari Bahadur, Tito Satya, Jire Khursani, Meri Bassai and Jhyaikuti jhayai. He was born in Kathmandu, Nepal. He did his schooling from Birendra Sainik Awasiya Mahavidyalaya, Bhaktapur. He started his career as an Assistant Director in movie Chokho Maya in year 1991 AD. Later he worked as a production manager in many Nepali films and also worked as a model and Line producer in Nepali Advertisement industry. He won best screen play and best film award for his debut direction movie 'Timi Sanga'.

|2019
|Poi Paryo Kaley
|
|Shishir Rana
|Actor/Director/Writer
|-
|2022
|Samjhana Birsana
|
|Nimesh Pradhan
|Actor
|-
|2023
|Chakka Panja 4
|
|Hemraj BC
|Actor
|-
|2023
|Gulabi
|
|Samundra Bhatta
|Actor

References

External links
http://reelnepal.com/name/1648/shishir-rana

Nepalese actors
Living people
Actors from Kathmandu
1971 births
21st-century Nepalese male actors
Nepalese film producers